Como México no hay dos is a 1979 Mexican film. It stars Vicente Fernández.

External links
 

1979 films
Mexican drama films
1970s Spanish-language films
1970s Mexican films